Giulia Michelini (born 2 June 1985) is an Italian actress.

Career

Michelini was born in Rome, Italy in 1985. She made her acting debut at the age of 17 in 2002 in the third season of the police drama series "Distretto di Polizia", which was televised by Mediaset's Canale 5.

In 2003 she debuted in her first feature film, Remember Me, My Love, directed by Gabriele Muccino. From 2009 to 2016 she played Mafia boss Rosy Abate in the series Squadra antimafia - Palermo oggi. In 2017 she starred in Squadra antimafia'''s spin-off Rosy Abate - La serie''.

Filmography

Films

Television

Music videos

References

External links 
 

Living people
Italian television actresses
Italian film actresses
1985 births
Actresses from Rome
21st-century Italian actresses
People of Campanian descent